CCTV Cities is a 2008 British television documentary programme, produced and presented by journalist Donal MacIntyre.  Each episode featured a British town or city.  Leeds (Halton Moor and Leeds city centre), Wigan, Edinburgh and London were all featured.  The documentary was shown on Five.

Instances shown include an attempted suicide on a bridge in Leeds, where a man attempts to commit suicide by jumping into the River Aire, as well as police being attacked with missiles in Halton Moor, Leeds, when criminals attempted to regain a stolen car which the police were recovering.

References

British television documentaries
Channel 5 (British TV channel) original programming
2008 television specials
Documentary films about cities